The Revolutionary Workers Party of Bangladesh (RWPB) is a political party in Bangladesh, founded on 14 June 2004 after splitting from the Workers Party of Bangladesh due to disagreements regarding joint actions with the Awami League. The party initially used the name "Workers Party of Bangladesh" briefly after its founding. The party president is Khandaker Ali Abbas and the general secretary is Saiful Haque.

Mass organisations within the party include the Bangladesh Agricultural Labour Union (BALU), Viplavi Krishak Sanhati (Revolutionary Peasants Union) and Shramjibi Nari Moitreyi (Working Women's Unity). The party publishes the newspaper People's Democracy.

References

External links 
 

Communist parties in Bangladesh
Political parties established in 2004
Political schisms